Biesowiczki  (German: Beßwitzer Glashütte) is a settlement in the administrative district of Gmina Kępice, within Słupsk County, Pomeranian Voivodeship, in northern Poland.

The settlement has a population of 12.

See also
 History of Pomerania

References

Biesowiczki